Alcatel Micro Machining Systems (AMMS) was a French manufacturer of Deep Reactive Ion Etching systems. The company's headquarters were located in Annecy, France.

History 
Alcatel Vacuum Technology, AMMS' original parent company, had a long-running business in plasma processing.  Its first equipment based on an Alcatel patented Inductive Coupled Plasma (ICP) source, with independent source power and substrate bias control for deep etching of silicon, was launched in 1993.  AMMS was created as a subsidiary in 2006 to focus on silicon etching.

Alcatel Micro Machining Systems operated until 2008, when it was sold to the Tegal Company.  In 2011 SPTS acquired Tegal's DRIE assets (formerly AMMS). The deal included the transfer to SPTS of the capital stock and operations of Tegal France SAS, a wholly owned Tegal subsidiary.

Products 

The company previously manufactured DRIE systems including:
 Notching free
 Profile control
 Dry release
 Patented Sharp process: Super High Aspect Ratio
 Tapered via
 High etch rate
 V shape
 Cryo process
 Through the wafer
 High etch rate and low roughness
 High aspect ratio for 3D
 Fused Silica etching
 Low smoothness
 High aspect ratio holes

See also 
 Deep Reactive Ion Etching
 Microelectromechanical systems

References

Defunct technology companies of France